The 2007 CAA men's basketball tournament was an NCAA Division 1 College Basketball Conference tournament that was held at the Richmond Coliseum on March 2–5, 2007, to decide the Colonial Athletic Association conference champion. The winner advanced to the NCAA Men's Division I Basketball Championship tournament, a 65-team tournament to decide a national champion of college basketball.

Bracket

Honors

References

-2007 CAA men's basketball tournament
Colonial Athletic Association men's basketball tournament
CAA men's basketball tournament
CAA men's basketball tournament
Sports competitions in Virginia
Basketball in Virginia